The 1959 World Table Tennis Championships – Corbillon Cup (women's team) was the 18th edition of the women's team championship. 

Japan won the gold medal, South Korea won the silver medal and China won the bronze medal.

Medalists

Final tables

Group 1

Group 2

Group 3

Final group

Final Group Matches

See also
List of World Table Tennis Championships medalists

References

-
1959 in women's table tennis
Table